Carl F. Struck (January 29, 1842 – March 3, 1912) was a Norwegian American architect, who designed private residences, civic buildings and commercial structures throughout the Midwest in the latter part of the 19th century.

Biography
Carl F. Struck was born in Christiania (now Oslo) Jan. 29 and christened in Oslo domkirke (Cathedral) Apr. 27 the same year, His parents were Hans Henrik Struck born in Eutin, Ostholstein and spouse Rønnaug Marie Jonasdr Elg born in Faaberg, Oppland. He was educated there and in Copenhagen before immigrating to the United States in 1865. After employment at architectural offices in Brooklyn, Cleveland, Chicago and Marquette, he arrived in Minneapolis in 1881, where he worked for the next twenty years. Among his most important commissions were designs for Scandinavian fraternal buildings and churches.

The son of a German father and Norwegian mother (of Swedish descent), Struck was married to Vasillia Thrane (1852- 1920), whose father, Marcus Thrane, was one of the founding fathers of the Norwegian labor movement.

National Register of Historic Places
Two Minneapolis buildings designed by Carl F. Struck are in the National Register of Historic Places: the Bardwell–Ferrant House at 2500 Portland Avenue South and the Pracna Building in the St. Anthony Falls Historic District. Another one of his Minneapolis works, Dania Hall, was added to the National Register of Historic Places in 1974 and removed from the list after its destruction by fire in 2000. The main building of the Grain Belt Brewery in Northeast Minneapolis is also in the National Register of Historic Places. Although Struck did not contribute to its design, he was the architect for an office building at 1215 Marshall Street NE that was part of the complex.

Selected buildings
Minneapolis
1884 Chicago House 
1884 Harmonia Hall
1886 Dania Hall
1889 Normanna Hall 
1890 521 Cedar Avenue South 
1890 Pracna Building
1893 Grain Belt Office Building
Other locations
1880 Vernon County Courthouse in Viroqua, Wisconsin
1890 Boesch, Hummel, and Maltzahn Block in New Ulm, Minnesota
1891 Brown County Courthouse in New Ulm, Minnesota

Gallery

References

External links
Harmonia Hall
Chicago House
Grain Belt Office Building 
521 Cedar Avenue South
Buildings of Carl F. Struck
Courthouses
Vernon County
Brown County
Online book
My Minneapolis at the National Library of Norway.
44. The Story Of Normanna Hall
Historic American Newspapers
Carl F. Struck articles

1842 births
1912 deaths
19th-century American architects
Norwegian emigrants to the United States
Architects from Oslo
Architects from Minneapolis